Half a Loaf of Kung Fu is a 1978 Hong Kong action comedy martial arts film  directed by Chen Chi-hwa and written by Jackie Chan, who also starred in the lead role. The film co-stars Dean Shek and James Tien. The film was released in Hong Kong on 1 July 1978. Chan plays a bumbling kung fu student who becomes involved in a series of adventures in one of his first forays into the kung fu acrobatic slapstick comedy style that would become his signature.

Plot 
A bumbling long haired acrobat named Jiang desires to practice kung fu.  He finds an advertisement for work at the Mansion as a body guard. Jiang does not get the body guard position, but cons his way into a job using his kung fu skills, and gets himself into the middle of some shady business. He is told not to go near the "guest room" where the special guest is staying. A fellow employee tells Jiang that there is an evil witch who lives in the guest room and is not to be disturbed. Jiang of course is caught spying on her and is run off the land. He then encounters two kung fu masters fighting in the woods. He watches one kill the other, and when he leaves Jiang takes the body into town to collect the reward. Using the money from the reward, Jiang tries to fulfill his kung fu dreams and find a master. He is suddenly attacked by the crazy witch and is about to lose until a mystery master shows up and beats her. The master turns out to be a bum, and teaches Jiang kung fu. He then goes on a journey with a princess to find a special jade plant.

Cast 
 Jackie Chan as Jiang
 Dean Shek as Man with crane
 James Tien as Mater Mao
 Doris Lung as Fung's daughter
 Wu Ma as Urinating man
 Kam Kong as Ying Fu
 Kim Jeong-nan as Miss Lu
 Ma Ju-lung
 Miao Tian as Mr. Wan
 Lo Chao-hsiung
 Julie Lee as Snake woman
 Lee Man-tai as Old beggar
 Ko Keung as Man wearing a gold cap
 Kam Sai-yuk as Man wearing leopard skin
 Chiang Chi-ping
 Chui Yuen
 Miu Tak-san
 Ho Kong
 Yu Bong
 Li Min-lang as Man fighting with Whip Hero
 Wong Yiu
 Lam Kwong-wing
 Woo Hon-cheung
 Yeung Lit
 Che Tei
 Chan Kam-chu
 Man Lee-pang
 Lam Man-cheung
 Peng Kong

Box office 
In Hong Kong, the film grossed  upon release in 1978. In Japan, it was the 16th highest-grossing film of 1983, earning  .

Originally made in Hong Kong in 1978, Half a Loaf of Kung Fu was released in the U.S. in 1985. In France, the film sold 49,652 tickets upon release there in 1987.

Reception
Silver Emulsion Film Reviews says, Half a Loaf of Kung Fu is not a traditional kung fu film, it is an active attempt to parody and make light of the stoic seriousness that the genre is generally built upon.

See also 

 Jackie Chan filmography
 List of Hong Kong films
 List of martial arts films

References 
 Chan, Jackie with Jeff Lang. I am Jackie Chan: my life in action. New York: Ballantine, p. 222 and pp. 228–235.
 Thomas, Brian. Videohound's Dragon: Asian Action and Cult Films. Detroit: Visible Ink Press, p. 294.

External links 
 Half a Loaf of Kung Fu at Hong Kong Cinemagic
 
 
 

1978 films
1978 martial arts films
Hong Kong martial arts comedy films
Kung fu films
1970s Mandarin-language films
1970s martial arts comedy films
Wushu films
Films directed by Chen Chi-hwa
1970s Hong Kong films